Antal Kiss (30 December 1935 – 8 April 2021) was a Hungarian athlete, who mainly competed in the 50 kilometre walk.

He competed for Hungary in the 1968 Summer Olympics held in Mexico City, Mexico where he won the silver medal in the 50 kilometre walk.

References

1935 births
2021 deaths
Hungarian male racewalkers
Athletes (track and field) at the 1964 Summer Olympics
Athletes (track and field) at the 1968 Summer Olympics
Athletes (track and field) at the 1972 Summer Olympics
Olympic athletes of Hungary
Olympic silver medalists for Hungary
Medalists at the 1968 Summer Olympics
Olympic silver medalists in athletics (track and field)